Ptrukša is a village and municipality in Michalovce District in the Kosice Region of eastern Slovakia.

History
In historical records the village was first mentioned in 1281.

Geography
The village lies at an altitude of 109 metres and covers an area of 6.936 km². The municipality has a population of 520 people.

Culture
The village has a public library and a football pitch.

Transport
Ptrukša lies at the end of the local main road and its bus stops are a terminus for the local regular bus service.

Tourism
The village has a series of two large ponds at its centre, the Pallagcsa ponds, used for recreational boating and fishing.

The village is one of the major starting points for hiking in the Latorica Protected Landscape Area. There is a suspended rope foot-bridge for hikers outside of the village, spanning the Latorica river. The bridge is a part of the local hiking trails alongside the Latorica river and through its alluvial forests and meadows.

Gallery

External links

http://www.statistics.sk/mosmis/eng/run.html

Villages and municipalities in Michalovce District